The Prince-Bishopric of Worms, was an ecclesiastical principality of the Holy Roman Empire. Located on both banks of the Rhine around Worms just north of the union of that river with the Neckar, it was largely surrounded by the Electorate of the Palatinate. Worms had been the seat of a bishop from Roman times. From the High Middle Ages on, the prince-bishops' secular jurisdiction no longer included the city of Worms, which was an Imperial Free City (the Free Imperial City of Worms) and which became officially Protestant during the Reformation. The prince-bishops however retained jurisdiction over the Cathedral of Worms inside the city.

In 1795 Worms itself, as well as the entire territory of the prince-bishopric on the left bank of the Rhine, was occupied and annexed by France. In the wake of the territorial reorganizations that came with the German mediatization of 1802, the remaining territory of the bishopric, along with that of nearly all the other ecclesiastical principalities, was secularized. In this case, it was annexed by Hesse-Darmstadt.

Bishops of Worms, 770—1802

External links
 

Worms
Worms, Germany
Catholic League (German)
Upper Rhenish Circle
Dioceses established in the 9th century
Former Roman Catholic dioceses in Germany
States and territories established in the 860s
States and territories disestablished in 1802
861 establishments
9th-century establishments in Germany
1802 disestablishments in the Holy Roman Empire
Former countries
Former monarchies of Europe